James Balfour may refer to:

Politics
James Balfour, Lord Pittendreich (1525–1583), Scottish judge and politician
James Balfour (died 1845) (c. 1775–1845), Member of Parliament for Anstruther Burghs 1826–31 and Haddingtonshire 1831–35
James Maitland Balfour (1820–1856), Scottish politician, Member of Parliament for Haddington Burghs 1841–47
James Balfour (Australian politician) (1830–1913), Scottish-born Australian merchant and politician
James Balfour (mayor) (1867–1947), educator, lawyer and political figure in Saskatchewan, Canada
James Miller Balfour (1874–1943), Australian politician
James Balfour (Canadian politician) (1928–1999), Saskatchewan
Jim Balfour (1914–1990), Australian politician

Other
James Balfour, 1st Baron Balfour of Glenawley or Clonawley (died 1634), Scottish nobleman and courtier 
Sir James Balfour, 1st Baronet of Denmilne and Kinnaird (c. 1600–c. 1658), Scottish annalist and antiquary
James Balfour (philosopher) (1705–1795), Scottish philosopher
James Balfour (priest) (1731–1809), Newfoundland Church of England clergyman
James Balfour (British Army officer) (1743–1823), Commander-in-chief of Bombay, 1794; colonel of the 83rd Regiment
James Balfour (planter) (1777–1841), Scottish-born Surinamese planter
James Balfour (engineer) (1831–1869), Scottish-born New Zealand marine engineer
James Balfour (architect) (1854–1917), Canadian architect from Hamilton, Ontario, Canada

See also
Sir James Balfour Paul (1846–1931), Scottish herald, Lord Lyon King of Arms 1890–1926